Quincy is a city in Grant County, Washington, United States. The population was 7,543 at the 2020 census.

History

Geologic history
Quincy lies atop a part of the Columbia River Basalt Group which is overlain by Pleistocene outburst flood deposits.  The Missoula Floods had one of their outlets at Trinidad, close to Quincy and another near Ancient Lakes, which includes the Ancient Lakes of the Columbia Valley AVA. Glacial erratics carried from as far away as Montana can be found nearby. The area also has an abundance of rimrock.

Great Northern Railway
Quincy was founded as a railroad camp during construction of the Great Northern Railway in 1892, and was incorporated on March 27, 1907. It was named after Quincy, Illinois.

Grand Coulee Dam

The arrival of the water from the Grand Coulee Dam in 1952 changed the town.

Geography
Quincy is located at  (47.233691, −119.852296).

Climate
Quincy has a cold desert climate (BSk) according to the Köppen climate classification system.

Demographics

2010 census
As of the census of 2010, there were 6,750 people, 1,915 households, and 1,541 families residing in the city. The racial makeup of the city was 54.9% White, 0.4% African American, 0.9% Native American, 0.7% Asian, 0.2% Pacific Islander, 40.6% from other races, and 2.4% from two or more races. Hispanic or Latino of any race were 74.3% of the population.

There were 1,915 households, of which 55.2% had children under the age of 18 living with them, 55.2% were married couples living together, 16.2% had a female householder with no husband present, 9.0% had a male householder with no wife present, and 19.5% were non-families. 15.1% of all households were made up of individuals, and 6.7% had someone living alone who was 65 years of age or older. The average household size was 3.51 and the average family size was 3.87.

The median age in the city was 26.2 years. 36.6% of residents were under the age of 18; 11.5% were between the ages of 18 and 24; 26.9% were from 25 to 44; 16.6% were from 45 to 64; and 8.3% were 65 years of age or older. The gender makeup of the city was 50.7% male and 49.3% female.

2000 census
As of the census of 2000, there were 5,044 people, 1,470 households, and 1,176 families residing in the city. The population density was 2,252.8 people per square mile (869.4/km2). There were 1,552 housing units at an average density of 693.2 per square mile (267.5/km2). The racial makeup of the city was 75.1% White, 12.3% African American, 0.9% Native American, 3.6% Asian, 0.1% Pacific Islander, 5.5% from other races, and 2.4% from two or more races. Hispanic or Latino of any race were 12.5% of the population.

There were 1,470 households, out of which 50.1% had children under the age of 18 living with them, 62.0% were married couples living together, 11.8% had a female householder with no husband present, and 20.0% were non-families. 17.9% of all households were made up of individuals, and 8.5% had someone living alone who was 65 years of age or older. The average household size was 3.38 and the average family size was 3.79.

In the city, the population was spread out, with 36.0% under the age of 18, 10.6% from 18 to 24, 28.3% from 25 to 44, 16.1% from 45 to 64, and 9.0% who were 65 years of age or older. The median age was 27 years. For every 100 females, there were 106.3 males. For every 100 females age 18 and over, there were 104.7 males.

The median income for a household in the city was $32,181, and the median income for a family was $31,847. Males had a median income of $27,813 versus $18,750 for females. The per capita income for the city was $12,649. About 18.4% of families and 20.9% of the population were below the poverty line, including 24.5% of those under age 18 and 6.3% of those age 65 or over.

Activities
The City of Quincy is located in Central Washington with close proximity to winter and summer activities.  The area offers boating, water skiing, hunting, fishing, snow skiing, and concerts.  The Gorge Amphitheatre brings a variety of people through the Quincy Valley.

Quincy has several parks including an aqua park with a waterslide with 2 water fed half tubes, heated pools, and special areas for kids. The park is also home to a large field with a baseball diamond, playground, picnic area, and small skate-park.

Every 2nd Saturday in September, Quincy celebrates Farmer-Consumer Awareness Day. For a month beforehand, the roads leading to town are decorated with signs showing local crops and products made with them. On the day of the celebration, floats created by local schools and farm equipment parade through town. Free agricultural and geology tours are offered, as well as a produce sale, tractor pull, Farm-to-Market fun run, and many other activities.

Quincy celebrated its centennial in 2007.

Quincy High School won the 2A State Baseball Championship in 1998 and the 1A State Soccer Championship in 2014. In 2005, the Boys Basketball team took second in state. Every year Quincy has an annual Dru Gimlin 3 on 3 basketball tournament.

Economy

Farming
Quincy has long had an agricultural economy, which was enhanced by irrigation made possible with the Grand Coulee Dam. Major crops include potatoes, wheat, and timothy grass.

Orchards and vineyards are also displacing lower-value crops in the Quincy Valley. Washington State is a large grower of apples.

Technology
Technology companies such as Microsoft, Yahoo!, Dell and Intuit have located large data centers within the Quincy area since 2007. Microsoft's Columbia Data Center, built starting in 2006 and expanded several times, is said to be the world's largest data center. The centers, attracted to the area because of its abundant and cheap hydroelectricity, have been criticized for dodging fines from the Grant County Public Utility District for overusing electricity and for creating air pollution through their diesel backup generators.

The data centers are incentivized by tax credits offered by the state of Washington to stimulate economic development in the city. Two additional electrical substations are being built to handle expected demand from current and future companies.

Tourism
Although George is the closest town to the Gorge Amphitheatre, Quincy is the closest town that offers services such as motels and a full grocery store. Quincy sees an uptick in population during concerts. 

The semi-arid climate allows Quincy to go for weeks or months without rain during the summer. This makes nearby water recreation such as Crescent Bar a major draw. Quincy is the closest town with services to Crescent Bar.

Notable people

 Colleen Atwood

Controversy
The book Fateful Harvest is written about Quincy, and the realities of corporations dumping toxic waste onto farmland by relabeling it and selling it as fertilizer.

Notes

Further reading

External links
 
 

Cities in Grant County, Washington
Cities in Washington (state)